AT&T SportsNet Rocky Mountain is an American regional sports network owned by Warner Bros. Discovery through its sports unit as part of the AT&T SportsNet brand of networks, and is an affiliate of Bally Sports. Headquartered in Denver, Colorado, the network broadcasts regional coverage of sports events throughout the Rocky Mountain region, mainly focusing on professional sports teams based in the Denver metropolitan area, Utah and Nevada.

AT&T SportsNet Rocky Mountain is available on cable providers and live stream website on Stadium throughout Colorado, Utah, Nevada, Wyoming, Montana, Central & Eastern Idaho, northern New Mexico, western Kansas, western Nebraska, western South Dakota, parts of California, including all of San Bernardino County and Mohave County, Arizona; it is also available nationwide on satellite via DirecTV

History
AT&T SportsNet Rocky Mountain was originally launched on November 15, 1988, as the Prime Sports Network, a joint venture between Bill Daniels, United Cable (controlled by TCI), and Home Sports Entertainment. The first live event ever shown on the network was a Denver Nuggets - Los Angeles Lakers NBA game. The network was originally broadcast from 5 p.m. to midnight weekdays and 11 a.m. to midnight on weekends. Additional programming included the Denver Zephyrs (minor-league baseball), college games from the Big Eight, the Western Athletic and the Missouri Valley conferences, and Denver University hockey. Additionally, there was coverage of skiing, hunting, fishing, rodeo, boxing, tennis, and golf.

The network was one of the original members of the Prime Sports Network, a group of regional sports networks formed in 1989 as a partnership between Bill Daniels and TCI. It was officially renamed Prime Sports Network- Rocky Mountain to avoid confusion with the group which now had the same name. However, it still was often referred to on-air as "Prime Sport Network" or simply "PSN". In spring 1995, the network was renamed Prime Sports Rocky Mountain as part of a larger rebranding of the Prime's RSNs.

In October 1995, News Corporation, which formed a sports division for the Fox network two years earlier after it obtained the broadcast rights to the National Football Conference and sought to create a group of regional sports networks, acquired a 50% interest in the Prime Network from TCI parent Liberty Media. Later that year on November 1, News Corporation and Liberty Media relaunched the Prime Network affiliates as part of the new Fox Sports Net group, with the Denver-based network officially rebranding as Fox Sports Rocky Mountain. The channel was rebranded as Fox Sports Net Rocky Mountain in 2000, as part of a collective brand modification of the FSN networks under the "Fox Sports Net" banner; subsequently in 2004, the channel shortened its name to FSN Rocky Mountain, through the networks' de-emphasis of the "Fox Sports Net" brand.

On December 22, 2006, News Corporation sold its interest in FSN Rocky Mountain and sister networks FSN Utah, FSN Northwest and FSN Pittsburgh to Liberty Media, in an asset trade in which News Corporation also traded its 38.5% ownership stake in satellite provider DirecTV for $550 million in cash and stock, in exchange for Liberty Media's 16.3% stake in the company. On May 4, 2009, DirecTV Group Inc. announced it would become a part of Liberty's entertainment unit, part of which would then be spun off into the separate company under the DirecTV name, in a deal in which Liberty would increase its share in DirecTV from 48% to 54%, with Liberty owner John Malone and his family owning a 24% interest. DirecTV would operate its newly acquired FSN-affiliated networks through DirecTV Sports Networks, a new division formed when the split off from Liberty Media was completed on November 19, 2009.

On December 17, 2010, DirecTV Sports Networks announced that its four Fox Sports Networks-affiliated regional outlets – FSN Rocky Mountain, FSN Pittsburgh, FSN Northwest and FSN Utah – would be relaunched under the "Root Sports" brand. The network officially rebranded as Root Sports Rocky Mountain on April 1, 2011, with The Dan Patrick Show as the first program to air under the new brand. For nominal purposes, the Root Sports networks continued to carry programming distributed mainly to the Fox Sports regional networks to provide supplementary sports and entertainment programming.

On June 12, 2017, AT&T Sports Networks announced that the network, along with Root Sports Southwest, Root Sports Pittsburgh, and Root Sports Utah, will rebrand under the name AT&T SportsNet Rocky Mountain, with all network programming and on-air talent remaining intact. The name change took effect on July 14, 2017.

On October 1, 2021, AT&T SportsNet Rocky Mountain, along with sister networks AT&T SportsNet Pittsburgh, and Root Sports Northwest, was removed from Dish Network satellite and Sling streaming TV services.

Programming

Professional sports
AT&T SportsNet Rocky Mountain holds the regional cable television rights to MLB's Colorado Rockies, the NBA's Utah Jazz, the NHL's Vegas Golden Knights, and WNBA’s Las Vegas Aces. The network airs pregame and postgame shows before and after all Rockies, Jazz, and  Golden Knights games that it produces, as well as postgame shows for additional Golden Knights games that it does not televise. Additionally, the station produces and airs several Rockies insider programs, including The Club: Colorado Rockies, Rockies Double Play, and Rockies Real Time, and one Golden Knights insider program, Knight Life. Currently, the network does not air any ancillary shows for any of their other professional sports programming (other than the Jazz pregame and postgame shows), with some rare exceptions, including a 2018 documentary titled Hot Rod: The Untold Story of Hot Rod Hundley, that chronicled the life and career of the former Utah Jazz announcer.

College sports
The network also carries many collegiate sports events, including Wyoming Cowboys/Cowgirls basketball, West Coast Conference basketball, and Colorado College hockey.

Former programming

Professional sports
The channel formerly served as the regional cable broadcaster of the NBA's Denver Nuggets and the NHL's Colorado Avalanche, losing the broadcast rights in 2004 when the owner of both teams, Stan Kroenke, launched the competing regional sports network Altitude Sports and Entertainment. The station also served as the regional home of select Western Hockey League broadcasts, beginning with the 2009–10 season and ending with the 2014–15 season.

College and high school sports

 Denver Pioneers hockey and men's and women's basketball (now on Altitude Sports and Entertainment)
 Colorado Buffaloes sporting events and insider programming (now on Pac-12 Network)
 Big Sky Conference football (now on Scripps TV affiliates)
 Mountain West Conference football and men's basketball (The network still airs a minimal amount of Wyoming men's and women's basketball, as mentioned above.)
 Colorado High School Activities Association football was also a network staple until Altitude took over broadcasting rights beginning with the 2013 season.

Regional subfeeds

West subfeed
On May 23, 2017, it was announced that the network had acquired the regional cable rights to the new Vegas Golden Knights NHL expansion team. These telecasts are available in all of Nevada, and parts of Arizona, and California, including all of San Bernardino County, as well as Utah, Wyoming, and Idaho. The games are also made available on sister network Root Sports Northwest in northern Idaho and Montana.

In June 2018, AT&T SportsNet acquired rights to the newly-relocated Las Vegas Aces of the WNBA.

Utah subfeed

In late 1989, TCI launched Prime Sports Network-Utah as a replacement from their game-only Jazz Cable Network. Although it originally was considered a separate network, at some point it began to operate as a subfeed with almost identical programming. The main feature of this Utah-based network had always been Utah Jazz basketball games. Over the years it was known as Prime Sports Intermountain West, Fox Sports Utah and finally Root Sports Utah.  When AT&T took over the network all Utah branding was dropped and it now operates as a true subfeed. Jazz games produced by AT&T SportsNet Rocky Mountain are also available in Idaho and Montana on sister-network Root Sports Northwest.

On-air staff

Current on-air staff
Colorado Rockies
 Kelsey Wingert – Rockies pre-game and post-game host, on field reporter 
 Jenny Cavnar – Rockies pre-game and post-game host, fill in play by play, on field reporter
 Drew Goodman – Rockies play-by-play and college basketball and football play-by-play
 Jeff Huson – Rockies color analyst, pre-game and post-game analyst
 Marc Stout – Rockies pre-game and post-game host, on field reporter 
 Ryan Spilborghs – Rockies color analyst, pre-game and post-game analyst, on field reporter
 Cory Sullivan – Rockies pre-game and post-game analyst
 Jack Corrigan – Rockies fill in play by play

 Las Vegas Aces
 Anne Marie Anderson – Aces play-by-play
 Rushia Brown – Aces color commentary
 Amanda Pflugrad – Aces sideline reporter
 Katy Winge – Aces sideline reporter

Utah Jazz
 Thurl Bailey – Utah Jazz color commentary
 Craig Bolerjack – Utah Jazz play-by-play
 Alema Harrington – Jazz Live studio host
 Holly Rowe – Utah Jazz color commentary
 Michael Smith – Jazz Live studio analyst

Vegas Golden Knights
 Darren Eliot – Golden Knights studio analyst
 Dave Goucher – Golden Knights play-by-play
 Shane Hnidy – Golden Knights analyst
 Stormy Buonantony – Golden Knights reporter
 Mike McKenna (ice hockey) – Golden Knights studio analyst
 Daren Millard – Golden Knights studio host

College sports
 Ceal Barry – college basketball analyst
 Sherdrick Bonner – college football analyst
 Drew Goodman – college basketball and football play-by-play announcer
 Charlie Host – college hockey analyst
 Mark Johnson – college football analyst
 Jay Leeuwenburg – college football analyst
 Taylor McGregor – college football sideline reporter
 Brad Thompson – college football sideline reporter
 Darius Walker – college football analyst
 Ari Wolfe – college football play-by-play announcer

References

External links
 

1988 establishments in Colorado
AT&T SportsNet
Bally Sports
Fox Sports Networks
Prime Sports
Sports in Denver
Television channels and stations established in 1988
Television stations in Denver